Red man syndrome may refer to:
 Red man syndrome (Drug eruption)
 Erythroderma

Drug eruptions
Papulosquamous hyperkeratotic cutaneous conditions